Attila Forrai (born 19 August 1973) is a Hungarian footballer who played for BVSC Budapest as midfielder.

Forrai previously played in the Regionalliga with Sportfreunde Siegen.

References

1973 births
Living people
People from Bonyhád
Hungarian footballers
Hungarian expatriate footballers
Association football midfielders
Budapest Honvéd FC players
Ferencvárosi TC footballers
Gázszer FC footballers
Budapesti VSC footballers
Demecser FC footballers
Gödöllői FC footballers
FC Dabas footballers
Expatriate footballers in Germany
Expatriate footballers in Austria
Lombard-Pápa TFC footballers
Mosonmagyaróvári TE 1904 footballers
Sportspeople from Tolna County